Anna-Lena Grönefeld and Jean-Julien Rojer were the defending champions, but lost in the second round to Chan Yung-jan and John Peers.

Bethanie Mattek-Sands and Mike Bryan won the title, defeating Lucie Hradecká and Marcin Matkowski in the final, 7–6(7–3), 6–1.

Seeds

Draw

Finals

Top half

Bottom half

External links
 Draw
2015 French Open – Doubles draws and results at the International Tennis Federation

Mixed Doubles
French Open - Mixed Doubles
French Open - Mixed Doubles
French Open by year – Mixed doubles